We Ran is a 1998 rock album by American singer, songwriter, and producer Linda Ronstadt. The disc featured back-up from three members of Tom Petty and The Heartbreakers. It spent two weeks on the Billboard albums chart, peaking at #160.

This disc was taken out of print in 2009.

On this album, Ronstadt interprets a mixture of rock material by various songwriters, including Bruce Springsteen, John Hiatt, and Bob Dylan.

Track listing

Personnel 
 Linda Ronstadt – lead and backing vocals
 Benmont Tench – acoustic piano, Hammond organ
 Ethan Johns – acoustic guitar, electric guitar, slide guitar,  mandolin, ukulele, drums
 Bernie Leadon – acoustic guitar,  electric guitar, mandocello, backing vocals
 Andy Fairweather Low – acoustic guitar, electric guitar, baritone guitar
 Mike Campbell – electric 6-string guitar, 12-string guitar, acoustic guitar
 Waddy Wachtel – electric guitar
 Brian Stoltz - guitars
 Fred Tackett - guitars
 Dean Parks - guitars
 James "Hutch" Hutchinson – electric bass
 Howie Epstein - electric bass
 Bob Glaub – electric bass
 Leland Sklar – electric bass
 Daryl Johnson - electric bass
 Russ Kunkel – drums, percussion
 Plas Johnson – saxophone
 Don Grolnick - keyboards
 Jon Gilutin - organ
 Jim Cox - piano, Hammond organ
 Robbie Buchanan - synthesizers
 Carlos Vega - drums, percussion
 Jim Keltner - drums
 Michael Ronstadt - backing vocals
 Marlena Jeter - background vocals
 Alexandra Brown - background vocals
 Mortonette Jenkins - background vocals
 Michael Lennon - background vocals, tambourine
 Mark Lennon - background vocals
 Kip Lennon - background vocals
 John Ronstadt - background vocals
 William Ronstadt - background vocals
 Melinda Ronstadt - background vocals
 Peter Ronstadt - background vocals
 Suzy Ronstadt - background vocals

Production 
 Glyn Johns – producer (Tracks 1, 2, 3, 5, 8, 10 & 11), mixing (Tracks 1, 2, 3, 5 & 7-11)
 Peter Asher – producer (Tracks 4 & 6)
 George Massenburg – producer (Tracks 4 & 6), mixing (Tracks 4 & 6)
 Linda Ronstadt – producer (Track 6)
 Waddy Wachtel – producer (Tracks 7 & 9)
 Bob Ludwig – mastering 
 Ivy Skoff – project coordinator 
 John Kosh – art direction, design 
 Ira Koslow – management

References

1998 albums
Linda Ronstadt albums
Albums produced by Glyn Johns
Asylum Records albums
Albums produced by Waddy Wachtel
Albums produced by George Massenburg